Howard Raggatt is an Australian architect, member of the firm Ashton Raggatt McDougall, and best known for the design of the National Museum of Australia, opened in 2001.

References

Australian architects
Living people
Year of birth missing (living people)
RMIT University alumni
Academic staff of RMIT University
Place of birth missing (living people)